Spir or SPIR may refer to:

Spir, recently discovered class of actin nucleators in actin remodeling
Afrikan Aleksandrovich Spir (1837–1890), Russian philosopher
Juan Carlos Spir (1990) Colombian tennis player 
Spir (album), an album by Karl Seglem's Sogn-A-Song
Spir (imprint), an imprint of VDM Publishing that publishes and sells Wikipedia articles in printed form via print on demand
Il spir, a viewing platform in the canton of Graubünden in Switzerland
Spectral presaturation with inversion recovery, a sequence of magnetic resonance imaging

Acronyms
Serviciul de Poliție pentru Intervenție Rapidă, a Romanian rapid response police unit
Special Purpose Islamic Regiment, a Chechen organization
Standard Portable Intermediate Representation, an intermediate language for parallel compute and graphics by Khronos Group